8-Phenyltheophylline (8-phenyl-1,3-dimethylxanthine, 8-PT) is a drug derived from the xanthine family which acts as a potent and selective antagonist for the adenosine receptors A1 and A2A, but unlike other xanthine derivatives has virtually no activity as a phosphodiesterase inhibitor. It has stimulant effects in animals with similar potency to caffeine. Coincidentally 8-phenyltheophylline has also been found to be a potent and selective inhibitor of the liver enzyme CYP1A2 which makes it likely to cause interactions with other drugs which are normally metabolised by CYP1A2.

See also 
 8-Chlorotheophylline
 8-Cyclopentyltheophylline
 DPCPX
 DMPX
 Xanthine

References 

Adenosine receptor antagonists
Xanthines